The Black Path (2006) is a crime novel by Swedish writer Åsa Larsson, the third in the Rebecka Martinsson series. It was published in the US in 2008 in paperback by Bantam Dell, and in the UK in 2012 in hardcover by MacLehose Press.

Irene Scobbie of Swedish Book Review states that the strength of the work is in the character portrayal and in the "authentic Lapland setting". She believes that several of the native Lapland characters have "an almost exotic flavour: an old woman with clairvoyant qualities, two peasant women with artistic gifts, and Killis’s young half-sister who embodies all these qualities and (less convincing in the final stages) becomes a kind of Pippi Longstocking figure as she takes on her half-brother’s enemies".

References

2006 Swedish novels
Novels by Åsa Larsson
Rebecka Martinsson books
Swedish crime novels
Albert Bonniers Förlag books
Bantam Books books